Oreodera affinis is a species of beetle in the family Cerambycidae. It was described by Charles Joseph Gahan in 1892.

References

Oreodera
Beetles described in 1892
Taxa named by Charles Joseph Gahan